The Highwaymen, also referred to as the Florida Highwaymen, are a group of 26 African American landscape artists in Florida. Two of the original artists, Harold Newton, and Alfred Hair, received training from Alfred “Beanie” Backus. It is believed they may have created a body of work of over 200,000 paintings. They challenged many racial and cultural barriers. Mostly from the Fort Pierce area, they painted landscapes and made a living selling them door-to-door to businesses and individuals throughout Florida from the mid-1950s through the 1980s. They also sold their work from the trunks of their cars along the eastern coastal roads (A1A and US 1).

The Highwaymen created large numbers of relatively inexpensive landscape paintings using construction materials rather than traditional art supplies. As no galleries would accept their work, they sold them in towns and cities and along roadsides throughout Florida, often still wet, out of the trunks of their cars. Their success and longevity is remarkable considering they began their career in the racially unsettled and violent times of the 50s in Florida  and amid the social conditions of the Jim Crow South where the stirrings of the civil rights movement were only just beginning. They have been called "The Last Great American Art Movement of the 20th century".

History
In 1955, 19-year-old African American artist Harold Newton was convinced by A. E. Backus, a prominent Florida landscape artist, to create paintings of landscapes rather than religious scenes. Newton sold his landscapes from the trunk of his car because art galleries in South Florida refused to represent African Americans. The following year, 14-year-old Alfred Hair began taking formal art lessons from Backus and, after three years, also began selling landscape paintings. Newton and Hair inspired a loose-knit group of African American artists to follow their leads. Newton is recognized by fellow artists for his technical inspiration while Hair is the considered the leader and catalyst "who set the tone for the group through the 1960s." They attracted a group of a "young, energetic" artists who painted large quantities of brilliantly colorful impressionistic landscapes that they each sold from their cars. In 1970, the group lost its charismatic leader when Hair was killed in a barroom brawl at age 29 and the prodigious output of the movement's artists began to wane. By the 1980s, a shift in public tastes and the growth of corporate entities like Disney World further reduced the demand for the movement's art.

In the mid-1990s Jim Fitch, a Florida art historian, and Jeff Klinkenberg, of the St. Petersburg Times wrote several newspaper articles about the group whom Fitch dubbed "The Florida Highwaymen" for their business of selling art door-to-door along Florida's Highway 1. The attention created new interest for their idyllic landscapes of natural settings in Florida igniting sales of the paintings. This activity increased the value of the artwork and created further demand. All 26 Florida Highwaymen were inducted into the Florida Artists Hall of Fame in 2004.

Their renown grew internationally during the early 2000s and the 26 members have been recognized for their extensive contribution and vivid documentation of mid-twentieth century Florida culture and history. Of the remaining artists in the original group (13 deceased) all but one artist continue to paint to this day, more than 50 years since they first started to paint, even though most artists are now in their 70s and some nearing their 80s. Over time their style has evolved into more carefully created works and away from the original "fast painting" techniques that enabled them to produce large quantities of paintings in their early years.

Style
The Highwaymen were mostly self-taught painters, who mentored each other. Excluded from the traditional world of art shows and galleries, the Highwaymen painted on inexpensive upson board or masonite and framed their paintings with crown molding (brushed with gold or silver paint to "antique" them).  They packed these paintings into the trunks of their cars and sold them door-to-door throughout the south-eastern coast of Florida.  Sometimes the paintings were stacked before the oil paint was dry. Painting en plein air style, the Highwaymen artists "eschew[ed] any formal color theory and rel[ied] on instinct and intuition to depict their steady stream of beaches, palm trees and Everglades scenes. Organic colors were not their main focus; they wanted to wow buyers with burnt-orange Florida skies or unnaturally florescent clouds."

Membership
It was not a formal movement and represented no "official" group, yet The Highwaymen thrived as artists and entrepreneurs through their sheer determination to succeed as painters and not as laborers in citrus groves, their expected social role. The works are also classified as "Outsider Art", or "Folk Art". They honed techniques to rapidly produce their paintings and developed strategies to sell and market their artwork outside of the formal world of art galleries and exhibitions. Their story is one of African Americans who carved out unique economic opportunities despite the social conditions of the Jim Crow South.

In 2004, twenty-six African-American artists were identified as Highwaymen. These artists were inducted into the Florida Artists Hall of Fame in 2004 as the Highwaymen and include: Curtis Arnett, Hezekiah Baker, Al "Blood" Black, brothers Ellis and George Buckner, Robert Butler, Mary Ann Carroll (the only woman in the group), brothers Johnny and Willie Daniels, Rodney Demps, James Gibson, Alfred Hair, Isaac Knight, Robert Lewis, John Maynor, Roy McLendon, Alfonso "Poncho" Moran, brothers Sam, Lemuel and Harold Newton, Willie Reagan, Livingston "Castro" Roberts, Carnell "Pete" Smith Sr., Charles Walker, Sylvester Wells, and Charles "Chico" Wheeler.

The lone "Highwaywoman" Mary Ann Carroll (1940-2019) lived in obscurity for many years. Carroll was the guest of honor at First Lady Michelle Obama's First Lady's Luncheon on May 18, 2011. Carroll presented a poinciana tree painting to Mrs. Obama.

Of these twenty six, nine are considered "original" (or the earliest) Highwaymen: Harold Newton, Alfred Hair, Roy McLendon, James Gibson, Livingston Roberts, Mary Ann Carroll, Sam Newton, Willie Daniels, and Al Black.

In 2008, a second hour-long PBS-TV documentary film was released called "The Highwaymen: Legends of the Road". It was produced by father and son team Jack and John Hambrick (both veteran TV news journalists). The original, titled "The Highwaymen: Florida's Outsider Artists" premiered at the Appleton Museum in Ocala in 2003 and was picked up by PBS. It generally airs during Black History month. Narrated by Spencer Christian, the Hambrick team was responsible for this one as well and the second, more commercial oriented documentary.

As of May 2022, eighteen are deceased, Alfred Hair, Alfonso Moran, Carnell Smith, Charles Wheeler, Ellis and George Buckner, Harold Newton, Hezekiah Baker, Isaac Knight, James Gibson, John Maynor, Johnny Daniels, Lemuel Newton, Livingston Roberts, Mary Ann Carroll, Robert Butler, Rodney Demps, and Willie Daniels.
Most of the paintings are signed, but there are a number of paintings that weren't, there are a number of paintings that are sold as "Highwaymen Style" that emulate the iconic landscapes of the Highwaymen artists. Older paintings from the 1950s and early 60s era are more sought after by collectors.

The A. E. Backus Gallery & Museum in Fort Pierce, Florida holds an annual exhibition of highwaymen artwork.

Exhibits

The Museum of Florida History in Tallahassee has paintings by twenty-three of the original twenty-six artists.

In August thru to October 2011, at Howard University, Washington, D.C. Entitled"The Road to Freedom," a section of early Highwaymen paintings, was on view over the summer at Blackburn Gallery at Howard University, the historically black university.

In February 2016, an exhibition in Ottawa, Canada was sponsored by the United States Embassy for US Black History month. The exhibit at the SAW Gallery included 30 paintings by all members of the Florida Highwaymen and a documentary.

In 2017, an exhibit titled “The Florida Highwaymen: Art Innovators in a Civil Rights Epoch” was held at Homer & Dolly Hand Art Center at Stetson University in Daytona Beach.

Venues for other exhibits have included the Smithsonian National Museum of African American History and Culture (Washington D.C.), Orange County Regional History Center (Orlando, Florida), The Florida House (Washington, D.C.), Elliott Museum (Stuart, Florida), and The Florida Aquarium (Tampa, Florida).

In March 2020, Florida legislature passed a bill creating specialty license plates to honor the group's work.

Bibliography 

 The Highwaymen: Florida's African-American Landscape Painters. Monroe, Gary (2001).  University Press of Florida. . 
 Florida's Highwaymen: Legendary Landscapes. Beatty, Bob (2005). Historical Society of Central Florida, Incorporated. .
 Mary Ann Carroll: The First Lady of the Highwaymen. Monroe, Gary (2014). Gainesville, Florida: University Press of Florida. .
 The Highwaymen Murals: Al Black's Concrete Dreams. Monroe, Gary (2009). University Press of Florida. .

See also

 African American art

References

External links
 Florida Highwaymen Paintings, History, News, Videos and more, a Florida Highwaymen resource website
 ON THE TRAIL OF THE HIGHWAYMEN, a South Florida Sun Sentinel article by Jeff Klinkenberg 
 Florida House Washington D.C. Highwaymen Exhibit from floridaembassy.com Highwaymen Exhibit in Washington D.C.
 The Highwaymen, Legends of the Road, 2008 PBS documentary
 the Highwaymen on "The Arts Connection" by WMFE-TV
 Traveling exhibition at The Orange County History Center, Florida
 Voices of the Highwaymen, a Sarasota Observer article by Nick Friedman with several images of paintings
 African American Impressionist artists The Florida Highwaymen Collection For Exhibit 
 Amazing art story: The Florida Highwaymen (and woman) newspaper article on Mary Ann Carroll for her appearance in Ottawa

African-American artists
American artists
African-American cultural history
Artists from Florida
Folk artists
Fort Pierce, Florida